Boris Aleksandrovich Vostrosablin (born 7 October 1968) is a retired Russian professional footballer.

Club career
He made his professional debut in the Soviet Second League in 1988 for SK EShVSM Moscow.

Honours
 Russian Cup winner: 1993.
 Korean League Cup runner-up: 1998.
 Kazakhstan Premier League champion: 2000.

European club competitions
With FC Torpedo Moscow.

 UEFA Cup 1992–93: 3 games.
 UEFA Cup Winners' Cup 1993–94: 1 game.
 UEFA Cup 1996–97: 4 games, 2 goals.

References

External links
 

1968 births
Living people
Soviet footballers
Russian footballers
Russian expatriate footballers
Expatriate footballers in South Korea
Expatriate footballers in Kazakhstan
Russian Premier League players
FC Torpedo Moscow players
FC Torpedo-2 players
FC Fakel Voronezh players
Jeju United FC players
K League 1 players
Russian expatriate sportspeople in South Korea
FC Zhenis Astana players
Russian expatriate sportspeople in Kazakhstan
FC Arsenal Tula players
Association football midfielders
Association football defenders
FC Yenisey Krasnoyarsk players
FC FShM Torpedo Moscow players
FC Znamya Truda Orekhovo-Zuyevo players